The Vietnam War body count controversy centers on the counting of enemy dead by the United States Armed Forces during the Vietnam War (1955–1975). There are issues around killing and counting unarmed civilians (non-combatants) as enemy combatants, as well as inflating the number of actual enemy who were killed in action (KIA).  For search and destroy operations, as the objective was not to hold territory or secure populations, victory was assessed by having a higher enemy body count.

Overview
Since the goal of the United States in the Vietnam War was not to conquer North Vietnam but rather to ensure the survival of the South Vietnamese government, measuring progress was difficult. All the contested territory was theoretically "held" already. Instead, the US Army used body counts to show that the US was winning the war. The Army's theory was that eventually, the Viet Cong (VC) and People's Army of Vietnam (PAVN) would lose after the attrition warfare.

According to historian Christian Appy, "search and destroy was the principal tactic; and the enemy body count was the primary measure of progress" in General Westmoreland’s war of attrition. "Search and destroy" was coined as a phrase in 1965 to describe missions aimed at flushing the VC out of hiding, while the body count was the measuring stick for the success of any operation. Since the early stages of the war did not seek to hold territory, assessments of whether an operation was considered a victory or not was entirely based on having a higher enemy killed ratio for US commanders. Competitions were held between units for the highest number of VC/PAVN killed in action, or KIAs. Army and marine officers knew that promotions were largely based on confirmed kills. The pressure to produce confirmed kills resulted in massive fraud. Appy claims that American commanders exaggerated body counts by 100 percent. One study revealed that 61% of American commanders considered that body counts were grossly exaggerated.

Killing and counting of unarmed civilians 
Gunter Lewy estimated that 1/3 of those killed and counted as "enemy KIA" killed by US/ARVN forces were civilians. He estimates around 220,000 civilians were counted as "enemy KIA" in battlefield operations reports during battles against VC/NVA. Lewy estimated the use of free-fire zones was an important factor in this.
 For official US military operations reports on free-fire zones, there are no distinctions between enemy KIA and civilian KIA since it was assumed by US forces that all individuals killed in an area declared a free-fire zone, regardless of whether they were combatants or civilians, were considered enemy KIA. Since body counts was a direct measure of operational success, this often caused US battle reports to list civilians killed as enemy KIA. 
Author Alex J. Bellamy wrote that the inclusion of civilians killed led to discrepancies between weapons seized and official body counts, noting that the official "enemy KIA" body count during Operation Speedy Express, was over 10,000 enemy KIA with only 748 weapons recovered. A US Army Inspector General estimated that there were 5,000 to 7,000 civilian casualties from the operation. The My Lai Massacre and Son Thang massacre both initially reported women and children killed as "enemy combatants".

Former Marine Officer and later war-time corresponding Philip Caputo in the book A Rumor of War noted:

Christian Appy in Working Class War documents and describes some atrocities committed by US forces. Civilian deaths from US airstrikes were sometimes blamed on the PAVN/VC or claimed as "VC" casualties by US forces in subsequent "Personnel Damage Assessments". Other reported incidents include ambushing or attacking unarmed groups of men such as fishermen or farmers, which were reported as "Viet Cong", as well as any civilians wearing black pajamas and civilians running away from helicopters, including women and children who were again reported as "enemy combatants" KIA. One notable example of this was the purported killing of hundreds of unarmed civilians by Tiger Force following grievous losses from a PAVN ambush, in which the unit proceeded to kill countless women, children and crippled individuals during Operation Wheeler/Wallowa. Journalist Jonathan Schell, who reported on Operation Cedar Falls, reported a general inability of US forces to discern VC from unarmed civilians, based on tacit ignorance of the culture and the killing of civilians on whim or suspicion. During the operation he was told about numerous incidents including when a man riding a bicycle past a patrol near his town was shot and subsequently declared a VC, and the shooting of a woman carrying medical supplies, who was then declared an enemy combatant serving as a medic post-mortem.

Body count inflation 
In the summer of 1970, H. Norman Schwarzkopf writes, "the Army War College issued a scathing report" that, among other things, "criticised the Army's obsession with meaningless statistics and was especially damning on the subject of body counts in Vietnam. A young captain had told the investigators a sickening story: he'd been under so much pressure from headquarters to boost his numbers that he'd nearly gotten into a fistfight with a South Vietnamese officer over whose unit would take credit for various enemy body parts. Many officers admitted they had simply inflated their reports to placate headquarters."

The junior officers queried in the 1970 "Study on Military Professionalism" (seemingly the study that Schwarzkopf refers to) had particularly violent reactions to instructions on the body count. "They told of being given quotas and being told to go out and recount until they had sufficient numbers. 'Nobody out there believes the body count,' was the reportedly common response."

In Lewis Sorley's book A Better War, published in 1999 after studies of voluminous previously-secret papers of Creighton Abrams, he writes "Body count may have been the most corrupt – and corrupting – measure of progress in the whole mess. Certainly the consensus of senior Army leaders, the generals who commanded in Vietnam, strongly indicates that it was. A survey found that sixty-one percent of officers believed that the body count was often inflated. Typical comments by the respondents were that it was 'a fake – totally worthless', that 'the immensity of the false reporting is a blot on the honor of the Army', and that they were grossly exaggerated by many units primarily because of the incredible interest shown by people like McNamara and Westmoreland."

Secretary of Defense Charles Hagel states that U.S. commanders on the ground inflated body counts since this was how their success was judged. "You used that body count, commanding officers did, as the metric and measurement of how successful you were", hence providing a positive incentive for deliberate fabrication. During the Battle of Dak To and the Battle of the Slopes, one company commander alleges after losing 78 men while finding 10 enemy bodies, the "enemy body count" figures were deliberately re-written as 475 by General William Westmoreland and released as official operational reports.

Shelby Stanton stated that accurate assessments of PAVN and VC losses were largely impossible due to lack of corresponding statistics, the fact that allied ground units were often unable to confirm artillery and aerial kills, and gamesmanship practiced by units under pressure to "produce results". American losses were subject to statistical manipulation as well. For instance, dying soldiers put aboard medical evacuation helicopters were often counted as only wounded in unit after-action tables.

Estimates of total casualties 

The official US Department of Defense figure was 950,765 communist forces killed in Vietnam from 1965 to 1974. Defense Department officials believed that these body count figures need to be deflated by 30%. The Ministry of Defense for Vietnam reported 849,018 military dead during the war for the period between 1955 and 1975 (of which a third were non-combat deaths). The Vietnamese government does not officially view the First Indochina War as separate from the later phase, and across all three wars, including the First Indochina War and the Third Indochina War, there was a total of 1,146,250 PAVN/VC confirmed military deaths. Per war: 191,605 deaths in the First Indochina War, 849,018 deaths in the Second Indochina War (Vietnam War), and 105,627 deaths in the Third Indochina War. In addition, more than 300,000–330,000 PAVN/VC soldiers remain officially missing in action (their bodies were not found), with some estimates putting the number as high as 500,000.

Lewis Sorley in A Better War cites Douglas Pike with a figure of 900,000 PAVN/VC dead and missing by 1973, and states that during a 1974 visit by Admiral Elmo Zumwalt to North Vietnam, PAVN General Võ Nguyên Giáp advised Zumwalt that the North had 330,000 missing. Jim Webb claims that the Vietnamese lost over 1.1 m soldiers. Geoffrey Ward and Ken Burns in the book The Vietnam War state over a million casualties were reported as well.

References 

Attrition warfare
Military history of the United States during the Vietnam War
Military science
Vietnam War casualties